The third Cuban National Series ended with the second straight championship for Industriales.

Standings

References

 (Note - text is printed in a white font on a white background, depending on browser used.)
 Orientales had been named Oriente prior to this season.

Cuban National Series seasons
Cuban National Series
1963 in Cuban sport
1964 in Cuban sport